Guam competed at the 1992 Summer Olympics in Barcelona, Spain. 22 competitors, 16 men and 6 women, took part in 27 events in 8 sports. As of 2022, it is Guam's largest Olympic delegation.

Competitors
The following is the list of number of competitors in the Games.

Archery

Men's Individual Competition:
 Luis Cabral 
 Ranking Round — 72nd place (0-0)

Athletics

Men's 400m Hurdles
Richard Bentley
 Heat — 57.04 (→ did not advance)

Women's Marathon
 Jen Allred – 3:14.45 (→ 36th place)

Cycling

Six cyclists, five men and one woman, represented Guam in 1992.

Men's road race
 Jazy Garcia
 Manuel García
 Martin Santos

Men's team time trial
 Wil Yamamoto
 Jazy Garcia
 Manuel García
 Martin Santos

Men's individual pursuit
 Manuel García

Men's team pursuit
 Jazy Garcia
 Manuel García
 Andrew Martin
 Martin Santos

Women's road race
 Margaret Bean — 2:29:22 (→ 52nd place)

Women's individual pursuit
 Margaret Bean

Judo

Sailing

Men's Sailboard (Lechner A-390)
Jan Iriarte
 Final Ranking — 405.0 points (→ 41st place)

Women's Sailboard (Lechner A-390)
Linda Yeomans
 Final Ranking — 270.0 points (→ 24th place)

Swimming

Men's 50m Freestyle
 Patrick Sagisi
 Heat – 24.78 (→ did not advance, 52nd place)
 Adrian Romero
 Heat – 25.12 (→ did not advance, 54th place)

Men's 100m Freestyle
 Patrick Sagisi
 Heat – 53.90 (→ did not advance, 55th place)
 Adrian Romero
 Heat – 54.77 (→ did not advance, 59th place)

Men's 200m Freestyle
 Frank Flores
 Heat – 2:00.48 (→ did not advance, 45th place)

Men's 100m Backstroke
 Patrick Sagisi
 Heat – 1:01.84 (→ did not advance, 46th place)

Men's 100m Breaststroke
 Glenn Diaz
 Heat – 1:10.32 (→ did not advance, 51st place)

Men's 200m Breaststroke
 Glenn Diaz
 Heat – 2:34.65 (→ did not advance, 46th place)

Men's 100m Butterfly
 Patrick Sagisi
 Heat – 58.08 (→ did not advance, 49th place)
 Ray Flores
 Heat – 1:01.10 (→ did not advance, 62nd place)

Men's 4 × 100 m Freestyle Relay
 Adrian Romero, Ray Flores, Frank Flores, and Patrick Sagisi
 Heat – 3:42.31 (→ did not advance, 16th place)

Men's 4 × 100 m Medley Relay
 Patrick Sagisi, Glenn Diaz, Ray Flores, and Adrian Romero
 Heat – 4:07.98 (→ did not advance, 21st place)

Women's 100m Breaststroke
 Tammie Kaae
 Heat – 1:16.78 (→ did not advance, 36th place)
 Barbara Pexa
 Heat – 1:17.71 (→ did not advance, 37th place)

Women's 200m Breaststroke
 Barbara Pexa
 Heat – 2:47.27 (→ did not advance, 36th place)

Women's 200m Individual Medley
 Tammie Kaae
 Heat – 2:36.31 (→ did not advance, 42nd place)

Weightlifting

Wrestling

References

External links
Official Olympic Reports

Nations at the 1992 Summer Olympics
1992
Olympic